Season 1888–89 was the thirteenth season in which Heart of Midlothian competed at a Scottish national level, entering the Scottish Cup for the thirteenth time.

Overview 
Hearts reached the fourth round of the Scottish Cup losing to Campsie.

Hearts Won the East of Scotland Shield beating Leith Athletic in the final.

Results

Scottish Cup

East of Scotland Shield

Rosebery Charity Cup

See also
List of Heart of Midlothian F.C. seasons

References 

 Statistical Record 88-89

External links 
 Official Club website

Heart of Midlothian F.C. seasons
Hearts